Diastasis may refer to:
 Diastasis (pathology) is the separation of parts of the body that are normally joined, such as the separation of certain abdominal muscles during pregnancy, or of adjacent bones without fracture
 Diastasis (physiology) is the middle stage of diastole during the cycle of a heartbeat

See also